John-Ross (JR) Rizzo, M.D., M.S.C.I., is an American physician-scientist at NYU Langone Medical Center. He is an Associate Professor, serving as Health System Director of Disability Inclusion at NYU Langone Medical Center and Vice chair of Innovation and Equity for the Department of Physical medicine and rehabilitation at Rusk Institute of Rehabilitation Medicine, with cross-appointments in the Department of Neurology and the Departments of Biomedical & Mechanical and Aerospace Engineering New York University Tandon School of Engineering. He is also the Associate Director of Healthcare for the NYU WIRELESS Laboratory in the Department of Electrical and Computer Engineering at New York University Tandon School of Engineering. He leads the Visuomotor Integration Laboratory (VMIL), where his team focuses on eye-hand coordination, as it relates to acquired brain injury, and the REACTIV Laboratory (Rehabilitation Engineering Alliance and Center Transforming Low Vision), where his team focuses on advanced wearables for the sensory deprived and benefits from his own personal experiences with vision loss.

He is also the Founder and Chief Medical Advisor of Tactile Navigation Tools, LLC, where he and his team work to disrupt the assistive technology space for those with visual impairments of all kinds, enhancing human capabilities.
He partners with a number of industrial sponsors and laboratories throughout the country to help breakthrough new barriers in disability research and/or motor control.

Early life and education 

As a young boy, he was diagnosed with Choroideremia, a congenital, X-linked, recessive disease of the retina and choroid, associated with nyctalopia and degenerative peripheral vision.  It has deeply influenced his thinking about functional dependencies and his professional goals.

Rizzo completed his undergraduate degree at New York University magna cum laude with an honors thesis in neural science and a double minor in chemistry and psychology. He was a Dean's Scholar and also conferred the Founders Day Award. He completed his medical school training on an academic scholarship at New York Medical College Alpha Omega Alpha (Iota Chapter) Honors and placed in top contention for his medical student research in neuro-ophthalmology under the tutelage of Prof. Sansar Sharma. His residency was completed at the Rusk Institute of Rehabilitation Medicine at New York University School of Medicine, where he completed a Chief Year and was selected for multiple leadership positions. His fellowship was completed in clinical research through the Physician Scientist Training Program at New York University School of Medicine’s Clinical and Translational Science Institute (CTSI) under a grant from the NIH (NCATS) in partnership with Rusk and the NYU Center for Neural Science / Dept. of Psychology under Prof.Michael S. Landy.

Career 

Since 2013 he has been a faculty member working on and creating teams that focus on a number of cutting-edge research foci: the Visuomotor Integration Laboratory (VMIL), focused on eye-hand coordination, as it relates to acquired brain injury (ABI), the REACTIV Laboratory (Rehabilitation Engineering Alliance and Center Transforming Low Vision), focuses on advanced wearables for the sensory deprived.

His quest is to better understand how eye control intersects with hand control during eye-hand coordination after acquired brain injury (ABI) and what role vision and eye movements play in hand-focused motor recovery. As a secondary mission, he has and will continue to focus on leveraging technology in novel applications to better objectify accepted clinical measures, to assist in instrumenting the medical ecosystem to improve medical science, and to create innovative assistive technologies to help foster functional independence.

Awards

Rizzo has won awards for his work in disability research, particularly focused on the intersection of ocular motor and manual motor control and on assistive technology. He was awarded the Crain’s 40 under 40 award in New York Business for his medical devices, including his wearable technology. In 2016, he was conferred the title of “Healthcare Re-writer” by Forbes and KPMG” (having conceptualized or worked on technologies that have the potential to massively transform healthcare). Dr. Rizzo has also been featured in a number of lay articles and also featured in videos and press releases. 
In 2018, he was a highlighted speaker in NYU's TEDx “Re-Vision” Series. in which he explains his life story and how he made turned his disability into a super power through the use of assistive technology and advanced wearables. In 2018, ACRM recognized John Ross Rizzo, for contributions to the field made during his early career work and he received the Deborah L. Wilkerson Early Career Award. He was inducted into the Susan Daniels Disability Mentoring Hall of Fame that honors those who are making a significant difference in the lives of youth and adults with disabilities through mentoring and to raise awareness about the importance of mentoring for individuals with disabilities(Class2019).

Grants and research

Broadly, Rizzo focuses on the best innovation practices to support novel technologies in clinical applications. He has worked to quantitatively characterize accepted clinical measures and to instrument the medical ecosystem to create algorithmic approaches to care routines.

His research mission is broadly divided into two scientific domains.

The first domain is motor control and behavioral science in brain injury. He seeks to understand how eye control intersects with hand control during eye-hand coordination after acquired brain injury (ABI) and what role vision and eye movements play in motor recovery. His Team was instrumental in characterizing eye-hand dyscoordination in stroke and has worked to translate these findings to other patient populations. The research was funded by the National Institutes of Health, among other foundations and governmental sponsors.

His second domain is assistive technologies. Given his penchant for technology and vision, he coupled his interests and began designing mobility solutions for the visually impaired. While the white cane is still the mainstay with regards to mobility solutions for those with vision loss, it is outdated. Dr.Rizzo and his Team have developed a new mechanical white cane that hybridizes the conventional cane with an adaptive mobility device called DragonFly. The DragonFly leverages a disparate navigation strategy that avoids the swinging and inefficiencies of current cane use, avoiding frequent musculoskeletal injuries and mitigating falls. He and his team have also developed a new advanced wearable platform that can be considered a sensory augmentative aid with omnidirectional spatial perception. This device maps the environment in three dimensions through the use of distance and ranging sensors, along with sensor fusion, and then selectively re-displays the information via a torso-mounted haptic interface, vibrating the obstacles in the user’s immediate vicinity onto their abdomen spatiotopically. Audio output is also leveraged through a bone conduction headset that also contains a microphone for voice control. The research was funded by the National Science Foundation, among other foundations, corporate sponsors, and governmental agencies.

Selected bibliography
Rizzo, John-Ross, et al. "Post-stroke Oculomotor Abnormalities evident during Objective Eye Tracking but Not under Clinical Assessment." STROKE. Vol. 46. TWO COMMERCE SQ, 2001 MARKET ST, PHILADELPHIA, PA 19103 USA: LIPPINCOTT WILLIAMS & WILKINS, 2015.
Rizzo, John-Ross, et al. "Objectifying eye movements during rapid number naming: methodology for assessment of normative data for the King–Devick test." Journal of the neurological sciences 362 (2016): 232-239.
Rizzo, John-Ross, et al. "Sensor fusion for ecologically valid obstacle identification: Building a comprehensive assistive technology platform for the visually impaired." 2017 7th International Conference on Modeling, Simulation, and Applied Optimization (ICMSAO). IEEE, 2017.
Rizzo, John-Ross, et al. "The intersection between ocular and manual motor control: eye–hand coordination in acquired brain injury." Frontiers in neurology 8 (2017): 227.
Rizzo, John-Ross, et al. "Disrupted saccade control in chronic cerebral injury: upper motor neuron-like disinhibition in the ocular motor system." Frontiers in neurology 8 (2017): 12.
Rizzo, John-Ross, et al. "eye control Deficits coupled to hand control Deficits: eye–hand incoordination in chronic cerebral injury." Frontiers in neurology 8 (2017): 330.
Rizzo, John-Ross, et al. "A new primary mobility tool for the visually impaired: A white cane—adaptive mobility device hybrid." Assistive technology 30.5 (2018): 219-225.
Rizzo, John-Ross, et al. "The effect of linguistic background on rapid number naming: implications for native versus non-native English speakers on sideline-focused concussion assessments." Brain injury 32.13-14 (2018): 1690-1699.
Rizzo, John-Ross, et al. "Eye-hand re-coordination: A pilot investigation of gaze and reach biofeedback in chronic stroke." Progress in brain research. Vol. 249. Elsevier, 2019. 361-374.
Rizzo, John-Ross, Sabrina Paganoni, and Thiru M. Annaswamy. "The “Nuts and Bolts” of Evidence-Based Physiatry: Core Competencies for Trainees and Clinicians." American journal of physical medicine & rehabilitation 98.10 (2019): 942-943.
Rizzo, John-Ross, et al. "Efficiently Recording the Eye-Hand Coordination to Incoordination Spectrum." Journal of Visualized Experiments 145 (2019): e58885.

References

External links
  at NYU Langone Medical Center
 Rizzo Google Scholar page 

 TED Talk:  (TED2018)
 Startup Health Interview 

American rehabilitation physicians
New York University Grossman School of Medicine faculty
New York Medical College alumni
Year of birth missing (living people)
Living people
New York University faculty